Secrecy is a 2008 documentary film directed by Harvard University professors Peter Galison and Robb Moss. According to its website, it "is a film about the vast, invisible world of government secrecy," and features interviews with a variety of people on all sides of the secrecy issue, including Steven Aftergood (of Federation of American Scientists), Tom Blanton (of the National Security Archive), James B. Bruce (who was a senior staff member to the Iraq Intelligence Commission), Barton Gellman (a Washington Post journalist), Melissa Boyle Mahle (a former CIA officer), the plaintiffs in United States v. Reynolds (1953) (the case which established the State Secrets Privilege in the United States), Siegfried Hecker (former director of Los Alamos National Laboratory), Mike Levin (a former member of the National Security Agency), and Neal Katyal and Charles Swift (the lawyers for the defendant in Hamdan v. Rumsfeld).

The film competed in the Documentary Competition at the 2008 Sundance Film Festival and at the Berlin Film Festival, among many other venues.

The film was the winner of the Special Jury Award for Documentary Features at the Independent Film Festival, Boston, and was named Best Documentary at the Newport International Film Festival.

See also
Khalid El-Masri

References

External links
 
 
 Review at Variety.com

2008 films
American independent films
United States government secrecy
American documentary films
Documentary films about American politics
2008 documentary films
2000s English-language films
2000s American films
2008 independent films
English-language documentary films